Tenpin Ltd (stylized "tenpin"), is one of the largest tenpin bowling brands in the United Kingdom, consisting of 48 bowling centres ranging from 12 to 36 lanes (depending on the width of the centre), which often have on-site bars serving food and drinks. They are principally located on retail and leisure parks alongside family leisure brands

The brand was formerly owned by Essenden Ltd, now Ten Entertainment Group plc who are a member of the Tenpin Bowling Proprietors Association (TBPA). The company is headquartered in Cranfield, Bedfordshire.

Operations
Many centres also include amusement arcades with attractions such as Sector 7 laser tag, table tennis, air hockey, pool, soft play, karaoke and escape rooms. Many existing sites were formerly known as Megabowl until around 2008–09. Tenpin carried out a rebranding of all sites during the late 2010s.

Tenpin sites are also used as venues for local and national ten-pin league competitions.

List of current locations

List of closed or sold off locations
 Chester - closed on 10 October 2013 along with the Cineworld 6-screen multiplex cinema located adjacent to the centre. Both complexes on-site have since been demolished, and replaced with an Asda supermarket in 2014.
 Newport - closed on 22 August 2005 as Megabowl and left empty with advertising and external signage still visible until 2016. The building is now a Home Bargains store, gym and ENERGI trampoline park.
 Maidenhead - closed 26 August 2018 and land returned to the local council, who demolished for car parking space.
 Tower Park (Poole) - Now operated by Hollywood Bowl.
 Bournemouth - closed as a Super Bowl and now operates as a lasertag arena.
 Hull - Closed during the late 1990s as Megabowl 
 Streatham - Closed in August 2006 as Megabowl, then demolished in May 2015. The site is now used as housing.
 Redditch - Closed in 2000 as Megabowl, then demolished and used for housing.
 Sunderland - Became MFA Bowl, then Disco Bowl, now "Sunderland Bowl".
 Stevenage - Closed in the early 2000s as a GX Super Bowl then demolished and became a Currys PC World on the Roaring Meg Retail Park.
 Bristol - Closed as a Megabowl, then demolished and turned into flats.
 Cardiff - Closed as a Megabowl. Land sold and the same unit is now a self-storage unit.
 Edinburgh (Fort Kinnaird) — Closed during the late 2000s, then demolished along with the adjacent cinema. Land later redeveloped into an extension to the Fort Kinnaird retail park, including new restaurants and a new Odeon cinema, completed in 2015.

References

External links
 Tenpin Ltd

Bowling alleys
Private equity portfolio companies
Tenpin bowling in the United Kingdom